The women's 5000 metres race of the 2012 World Single Distance Speed Skating Championships was held on March 24 at 12:00 local time.

Results

References

2012 World Single Distance Speed Skating Championships
World